The International League is an American minor league baseball organization.

International League may also refer to:

International League (California), a high-school athletic conference in Los Angeles County, California, U.S.
International League Against Epilepsy
International League against Racism and Anti-Semitism
International League for Human Rights
International League for the Reconstruction of the Fourth International
International League of Antiquarian Booksellers
International League of Conservation Photographers, an organization in the field of conservation photography
International League of Esperantist Radio Amateurs
International League of Esperanto Teachers
The International League of Dermatological Societies
International League of Humanists, located in Sarajevo
International League of non-religious and atheists, founded in Berlin
Ligue internationale de la paix (International League of Peace)
International Federation of Red Cross and Red Crescent Societies, sometimes known as the International League of Red Cross Societies
International League of Religious Socialists
International Alliance for Women in Music, which formed when the International League of Women Composers merged with other groups

See also